Charles Henry Benson (born November 21, 1960) is an American former professional football defensive end who played four seasons in the National Football League (NFL) for the Miami Dolphins, Indianapolis Colts, and Detroit Lions. Benson appeared in a total of 28 career games, while making 3 starts.

References

Living people
1960 births
Miami Dolphins players
Indianapolis Colts players
Detroit Lions players
Players of American football from Texas
American football defensive ends
Baylor Bears football players
National Football League replacement players